Miyal Syedan is a village located in Rawalpindi Tehsil Punjab Pakistan. It is in Chountra region and it belongs to Potohar town. It is almost 21 kilometers from Chakbeli khan and about 75 kilometers from Rawalpindi on Rawalpindi Chakwal boundary.

Villages in Rawalpindi District